Lamberti is a surname of Italian origin. The name may refer to:

Al Lamberti, American former Sheriff of Broward County, in southeastern Florida
Bonaventura Lamberti (1653–1721), Italian painter of the Baroque era
Edoardo Lamberti (1895–1968), Italian cinematographer
Giorgio Lamberti (born 1969), Italian Olympic swimmer
Giulio Lamberti (1895–1985), Italian rower
Giuseppe Lamberti (born 1973), Italian coxswain
Hermann-Josef Lamberti (born 1956), German banker and was Chief Operating Officer of Deutsche Bank until May 2012
Hernán Agustín Lamberti (born 1984), Argentine professional footballer
Ilario Davide Lamberti (born 1988), Italian footballer
Isabel Lamberti, Dutch filmmaker
Jean-Christophe Lamberti (born 1982), French professional football player
Jeff Lamberti (contemporary), American politician from Iowa; state legislator
Luciano Lamberti (born 1978), Argentine writer
Luigi Lamberti (1769–after 1812), Italian composer of operas
Medardo Lamberti (1890–1986), Italian rower
Niccolò di Piero Lamberti (1370–1451), Venetian sculptor
Niccolo Lamberti (fl. 14th century), Florentine painter
Professor Lamberti (1892–1950), American vaudeville and burlesque performer
Ralph J. Lamberti (contemporary), American local politician from Staten Island, New York
Tony Lamberti, American sound engineer
Vincent Lamberti (c. 1927/1928-2014), American chemist and inventor

See also 
 Lambertini

Italian-language surnames
Patronymic surnames
Surnames from given names